Terres de Bord is a commune in the department of Eure, northern France. The municipality was established on 1 January 2017 by merger of the former communes of Montaure (the seat) and Tostes.

See also 
Communes of the Eure department

References 

Communes of Eure